Gentlemen v Players was a long-running series of English first-class cricket matches. Two matches were played in 1806, but the fixture was not played again until 1819, and thereafter, it was played until 1962, typically twice each summer (though sometimes thrice or four times) except for in 1826, 1828, 1915–1918 (due to World War I) and 1940–1945 (due to World War II).

In essence, it was a match between teams consisting of amateur (Gentlemen) and professional cricketers (Players) that emerged 
from the English class structure of the 19th century: the Players were working class cricketers who earned their living through the game, whilst the Gentlemen were middle- and upper-class cricketers, usually products of the public school system, who were unpaid. 

For the matches, the Players were paid wages by their county clubs and/or fees by the match organisers, while the Gentlemen nominally only claimed expenses. However, while rules to distinguish amateurs from professionals were established by the Marylebone Cricket Club (MCC), the system of allowable expenses was both controversial and complex, leading to some leading amateurs being paid more for playing cricket than any professional.

The fixture struggled to gain public interest during the mid-19th century, as most matches ended with the Players defeating the Gentlemen by large margins: various efforts to improve competitiveness, including different-sized wickets for each team, odds matches, and a system of 'given men' (in which the Players would loan one or more of their best players to the Gentlemen) were generally unsuccessful, with the Players continuing to win most matches until later in the century.

The fixtures would become far more competitive and gain prestige with the rise and subsequent career of W. G. Grace, who played for the Gentlemen with great success. During the period from 1865 to 1914, the fixture was seen as one of the highlights of the cricket season, but the increasing popularity of international Test cricket (which began in 1877) saw its interest begin to decline, and after the Second World War, the concepts of amateurism and selecting teams based on social class were seen as increasingly anachronistic.

The fixture was discontinued on 31 January 1963 after the MCC abolished amateur status, with all first-class cricketers becoming nominally professionals (or "Players"): with this, the official distinction between the teams (and the raison d'etre for the fixture) ceased to exist. No direct substitute was implemented: instead, England's first domestic one day cricket competition began that summer.

History

At its height, from 1865 until 1914, the fixture was prestigious, though in terms of quality, it fell far short of Test matches, while being seen as close to the rival North v. South fixture. Until 1865, the Gentlemen teams were often very weak compared to the professional Players, and on occasion the fixture had to be arranged on an odds basis (so that the Players eleven took on a greater number of Gentlemen), with different-sized wickets, or with Players being loaned to the Gentlemen.

The Gentlemen becoming competitive coincided with the career of W. G. Grace, whose performances were so outstanding that the Gentlemen could enjoy some long-awaited success (their previous win prior to Grace's career had come in 1853). 

The fixture often confirmed the commonly held view of an imbalance between amateur and professional: amateurs tended to be batsmen first and foremost, hence there were few good amateur bowlers, while the Players could nearly always field a strong bowling side.

The game was played over three days on all but a handful of occasions throughout its history. The most frequent venue for the match was Lord's, but a number of other grounds were used, notably The Oval and Scarborough: it was at Scarborough that the last Gentlemen v Players game was played in September 1962.

The same format of amateurs playing professionals was used in a number of other fixtures, some of which were given first-class status (for example, "Gentlemen of Nottinghamshire v Players of Nottinghamshire"), but these matches became less common after the beginning of the 20th century, with the last such game being "Gentlemen of the South v Players of the South" in 1920. Afterwards, all first-class Gentlemen v Players matches were between teams known simply by those names.

On 31 January 1963, the distinction between amateur and professional players was abolished by the MCC; with this decision, the raison d'etre for the Gentlemen v Players fixture ceased to exist, and the series was ended. Charles Williams has described several reports on the subject which were submitted to MCC by its Amateur Status Standing Committee (ASSC), with the MCC committee unanimously agreeing to abolish amateurism. Williams also says while a substitute fixture was sought, it was decided not to pursue this, as the new Gillette Cup limited-overs competition was beginning in 1963.

There were contrasting views about the end of amateurism and the passing of Gentlemen v Players: some traditionalists like E. W. Swanton and the editor of Wisden Cricketers' Almanack lamented the passing of an era, but noted that social change had rendered the concept an anachronism, while Fred Trueman spoke for many when he described amateurism as a "ludicrous business" that was "thankfully abolished".

First matches

The inaugural fixture was a three-day match at the original Lord's ground from 7 to 9 July 1806. It was soon followed by the second, held on the same ground from 21 to 25 July. In the first match, the Gentlemen played with two "given men" in these were the two outstanding professionals of the day, Billy Beldham and William Lambert. Lambert made a significant contribution with the bat, and the Gentlemen won by an innings and 14 runs.

For the return match, the Gentlemen retained Lambert, while Beldham played for the Players. The Gentlemen won a low-scoring game by 82 runs, and Lambert was again a significant factor, although the leading amateur Lord Frederick Beauclerk made two good scores.

A curiosity of these matches is that they featured the veteran professional Tom Walker and the rookie amateur John Willes: these two players were both credited with devising the roundarm style of bowling, but there is no evidence to suggest they used roundarm in 1806.

Described by H. S. Altham as the "most famous of all domestic matches", the fixture disappeared until 1819. Altham says he does not know why, but the Napoleonic Wars must have been a factor, as cricket was in decline from 1810 until after Waterloo in 1815.

In 1819, the amateurs agreed to play the professionals on equal terms, but lost by six wickets. There was only one run between the sides on first innings, but the Gentlemen collapsed in the second against the bowling of Tom Howard and John Sherman to be bowled out for 60. This match was held at the "new" Lord's ground, the present one, which had opened in 1814. The fourth match was played at Lord's in June 1820, and the Gentlemen, now with star bowler Howard as a given man, won by 70 runs.

The fifth match earned notoriety: it was scheduled to be played at Lord's from 23 to 25 July 1821 but ended on the second day after the Gentlemen conceded. Known as the "Coronation Match" because it celebrated the accession of the unpopular George IV it was described by Derek Birley as "a suitably murky affair". The Gentlemen had batted first and were quickly dismissed for 60, and had to spend a long time in the field through most of the first and second days while the Players steadily built a big lead. At 270 for six, the Gentlemen conceded defeat.

Odds on
After the 1821 match, the fixture struggled for many years to regain credibility. Nine of the fourteen matches played from 1824 to 1837 were played at odds: for instance, in the 1836 match, the Gentlemen had eighteen men, and in the 1827 matches, seventeen men. 

In addition, the 1831 match was arranged as eleven a side, but the Players had only nine men appear, while in 1832, the Gentlemen defended a smaller-than-normal wicket of 22 by 6 inches, and in 1837, in what became known as the "Barn Door Match", the Players defended an oversized wicket of four stumps measuring 36 by 12 inches.

The tide turned somewhat in the 1840s, when Alfred Mynn and Nicholas Felix were playing for the amateurs: in nine equal terms matches from 1842 to 1849, the Gentlemen won five against three for the Players and one drawn. 

Once that run of success ended, the Gentlemen lost 23 of the next 25 games up to July 1865 (with a win in 1853 and a draw in 1862).

Halcyon days of amateur cricket
According to Harry Altham, the period from about 1860 into the 1880s were the "halcyon days of amateur cricket". 

This refers in part to the success of cricketers who came through the public schools and universities in the period, but in the main to the achievements of Gentlemen teams: in the period between 1865 and 1881, the Gentlemen won 27 matches against the Players whilst losing only five (seven were drawn). The key figure in this remarkable turnaround was W. G. Grace. 

Altham says that "the pendulum of power" had swung in the amateur direction and "never again was it found pointing so unequivocally to (amateur supremacy)".

Final years
Social change after the Second World War led to a reaction against the concept of amateurism in English cricket, and the last edition of the fixture was played on 8, 10 and 11 September 1962 at Scarborough, with the Gentlemen captained by Mike Smith (Ted Dexter was originally appointed as captain, but was forced to withdraw due to illness) and Fred Trueman captaining the Players. The Players won the game by seven wickets.

On 31 January 1963, the MCC ruled that all first-class cricketers were nominally professional, or effectively "Players": with this, the "Gentlemen" ceased to exist.

The events leading to the abolition of amateurism are described by Charles Williams in his book, Gentlemen & Players, appropriately subtitled The Death of Amateurism in Cricket.

2010 match
On August 15, 2010, there was a Twenty20 match between Gentlemen and Players at Wormsley, the first such match in 48 years.

For this match, the Gentlemen were represented by a selection of under-19 cricketers from Blackheath Cricket Club and state schools in South East London and the Tower Hamlets area - a modernised version of the original team - while the Players were an all-star team representing the Professional Cricketers Association Masters, captained by Robert Key.

After losing the toss and being sent in, the Players finished on 127/8, with the Gentlemen scoring 128/5 to win by five wickets off the final ball.

Records

Results 
In all, 274 matches were played over 135 years (in 1806, 1819-1825, 1827, 1829-1915, 1919-1939 and 1945-1962), with the Players winning 125, the Gentlemen 68, and 80 matches being drawn; the first match of 1883 was tied.

Largest margins of victory

By an innings
Players, innings and 305 runs: The Oval, 1934
Players, innings and 231 runs: Lord's, 1924
Players, innings and 181 runs: Lord's, 1860
Players, innings and 140 runs: Hastings, 1891
Players, innings and 128 runs: Lord's, 1946
Gentlemen record was innings and 126 runs: The Oval, 1879

By runs
Players, 345 runs: Lord's, 1823
Players, 285 runs: Lord's, 1858
Gentlemen, 262 runs, Lord's, 1875
Players, 241 runs: The Oval, 1914
Players, 206 runs, Lord's, 1878

By wickets
ten wickets: seven instances (all Players)
Gentlemen record was nine wickets: The Oval, 1872, and Prince's Cricket Ground, 1877

Smallest margins of victory

By runs
Tied match at The Oval, 1883
Players, one run: Hove, 1881
Players, two runs: Lord's, 1952
Gentlemen, four runs: Lord's, 1870
Gentlemen, five runs: Lord's, 1888

By wickets
one wicket: five instances (all Gentlemen)
Players record was two wickets: Lord's, 1856, Lord's, 1874, Lord's, 1900 and Scarborough, 1955

Highest team totals
Players, 651/7 dec: The Oval, 1934
Players, 608: The Oval, 1921
Players, 579: Lord's, 1926
Gentlemen, 578: The Oval, 1904
Gentlemen, 542: Lord's, 1926

Lowest team totals
Players, 24: Lord's, 1829 (first innings)
Gentlemen, 31: Lord's, 1848 (Gentlemen won the match)
Gentlemen, 35: Lord's, 3 July 1837
Gentlemen, 36: Lord's, 1831 (one man absent hurt)
Players, 37: Lord's, 1829 (second innings)

Highest individual innings

266*: Jack Hobbs, Players, Scarborough, 1925
247: Bobby Abel, Players, The Oval, 1901
241: Len Hutton, Players, Scarborough, 1953
232*: C. B. Fry, Gentlemen, Lord's, 1903
217: W. G. Grace, Gentlemen, Hove, 1871

Hundred in each innings of a match

102* & 136: R. E. Foster, Gentlemen, Lord's, 1900
104 & 109*: John King, Players, Lord's, 1904
125 & 103*: K. S. Duleepsinhji, Gentlemen, Lord's, 1930

Nine or more wickets in an innings

10–37: Alec Kennedy, Players, The Oval, 1927
10–90: Arthur Fielder, Players, Lord's, 1906
10-?: F. W. Lillywhite, Players, Lord's, 17 July 1837 (second innings; Gentlemen had 16 men)
9–46: John Stephenson, Gentlemen, Lord's, 1936
9–82: David Buchanan, Gentlemen, The Oval, 1868
9–85: Cec Parkin, Players, The Oval, 1920
9–105: Johnny Douglas, Gentlemen, Lord's, 1914
9-?: F. W. Lillywhite, Lord's, 3 July 1837

Thirteen or more wickets in a match

18-?: F. W. Lillywhite, Players, Lord's, 17 July 1837 (Gentlemen had 16 men)
14–221: Arthur Fielder, Players, Lord's, 1906
14-?: F. W. Lillywhite, Players, Lord's, 1829
13–141: Tom Richardson, Players, Hastings, 1897
13–144: Tich Freeman, Players, Lord's, 1929
13-?: F. W. Lillywhite, Players, Lord's, 1835
13-?: F. W. Lillywhite, Players, Lord's, 3 July 1837
13-?: James Cobbett, Players, Lord's, 1836 (Gentlemen had 18 men)

Five catches in an innings
Alfred Lyttelton, Gentlemen, The Oval, 1877
A. J. Webbe, Gentlemen, Lord's, 1877
Len Hutton, Players, Lord's, 1952

Four stumpings in an innings
E. H. Budd, Gentlemen, Lord's, 1819
William Slater, Players, Lord's, 1824 (Gentlemen had 14 men)

See also
 Amateur status in first-class cricket
 List of Gentlemen v Players matches
 Variations in first-class cricket statistics

References

Bibliography
 H. S. Altham, A History of Cricket, Volume 1 (to 1914), George Allen & Unwin, 1962
 Derek Birley, A Social History of English Cricket, Aurum, 1999
 Rowland Bowen, Cricket: A History of its Growth and Development, Eyre & Spottiswoode, 1970
 Arthur Haygarth, Scores & Biographies, Volumes 1–11 (1744–1870), Lillywhite, 1862–79
 Fred Trueman, Ball of Fire, Dent, 1976
 Roy Webber, The Playfair Book of Cricket Records, Playfair Books, 1951
 Charles Williams, Gentlemen & Players: The Death of Amateurism in Cricket, Weidenfeld & Nicolson, 2012, 
 Playfair Cricket Annual – various editions
 Wisden Cricketers' Almanack – various editions

 
Social class in the United Kingdom